Geoffrey Lewis Capes (born 23 August 1949) is a British former shot putter, strongman and professional Highland Games competitor.

He represented England and Great Britain in field athletics, specialising in the shot put, an event in which he was twice Commonwealth champion, twice European indoor champion, and competed at three Olympic Games.

As a strongman, he twice won the title of World's Strongest Man, was World Muscle Power champion on two occasions, and also had numerous other titles including Europe's Strongest Man and Britain's Strongest Man.

As a Highland Games competitor he was six times world champion, first winning the title in Lagos in 1981, and held world records in numerous events. Following retirement from competitive sport he continued to be involved in strength athletics as a referee, event promoter and coach. He also ran a sportswear retail shop, and became renowned as a world-class breeder of birds.

Early life
Capes was born in 1949 in Holbeach, Lincolnshire, the seventh of nine children. He was the seventh child of Eileen Capes, though the eldest of her three children by her third husband Bill Capes. Of his older siblings, the elder two were Braithwaites and the middle four Cannons. He grew up in the town and went to the local secondary school, George Farmer. He became a member of Holbeach Athletic Club where he was coached by Stuart Storey. He was a gifted sportsman, and represented Lincolnshire at basketball, football and cross-country. In addition he was a decent sprinter, running 23.7 s for the 200 m. Growing up on the Lincolnshire fens he had an early fascination with the natural world and cared for injured birds and animals from when he was a young boy. After school he worked as a coalman and an agricultural labourer, being able to load twenty tons of potatoes in twenty minutes. He joined Cambridgeshire Constabulary in 1970, and remained in the police for ten years.

Athletics
Capes was a shot putter and represented his country over a span of 11 years, winning two Commonwealth Games and two Indoor European Championship titles. His first major competition was the 1970 Commonwealth Games in Edinburgh, where he finished fourth. In the next two games in 1974 and 1978 he took the gold medal. In this period he also became the European Indoor Champion in both 1974 and 1976. His first Olympic experience was in 1972 when he competed in Munich. The 21-year-old Capes did not make it past the qualifying round, but improved on this considerably four years later. Having thrown a personal best of 21.55 m on 28 May 1976 at Gateshead, he went into the 1976 Montreal Olympics as one of the favourites for the gold medal. He came second in his qualifying group but sixth overall in the final, the winner being Udo Beyer of East Germany. 1980 was the year that saw Capes throw the longest distance of his career: his 21.68 m (71 ft. 3.5 in.) in Cwmbran on 18 May 1980 being a new Commonwealth and British record. He went into the Olympics as the athlete with the best distance that year and once again a favourite for the title. However, he eventually placed fifth, the winner being Vladimir Kiselyov whose Olympic record of 21.35 m was well short of what Capes had achieved prior to the Games. Capes said his performance at the 1980 Moscow Olympics had left him "numbed with disappointment".

Capes is the most capped British male athlete of all time, receiving 67 International caps and earning 35 wins, not including a further 35 caps for England. He is a winner of 17 national titles, including being seven times a winner of the AAA championship and three times UK champion. In 1983 he was voted Britain's best-ever field athlete. Capes' 1980 British record still stands. In 2003 Carl Myerscough threw further but the distance was not ratified.

Strongman
As a strongman, Capes became a household name in Britain and many parts of the world. He was particularly known for his incredible hand and arm strength, easily tearing London telephone directories in half and bending rolled steel bars measuring over 1 inch in diameter, and three feet in length. Capes turned fully professional in 1980, the Olympics in Moscow being his last event as an amateur athlete. He had already begun to make a name as a strongman having won the inaugural Britain's Strongest Man in 1979. In that competition he beat Bill Anderson, the World Highland Games champion into second place. Bill went on to the 1979 World's Strongest Man, the first Briton to compete in this tournament, whilst Capes concentrated on his athletic career. In 1980 the Olympics dominated the year and Capes did not compete in Britain's Strongest Man, but he did compete later in the Europe's Strongest Man competition and won that. This ensured his invitation to the 1980 World's Strongest Man and on his first entry he came third behind the by then more experienced Bill Kazmaier and Lars Hedlund. In 1981 he returned and improved to second place, again behind Kazmaier, and in 1982 he came fourth. The 1983 contest was the first held outside the United States and in Christchurch, New Zealand he held off the challenge of a world class field including the young Jón Páll Sigmarsson and to take the first of two World's Strongest Man titles. The Christchurch hosted tournament also had the Canadian world powerlifting champion, Tom Magee, and the European powerlifting champion, Siem Wulfse, competing. But it was the duel between Sigmarsson and Capes that heralded the beginning of a great rivalry. The following year in Mora, Sweden, Sigmarsson, eleven years Capes' junior, took the title proclaiming "The King has lost his crown!". Capes retorted "I'll be back" and the following year won the title in Cascais, his closing remark being "The King has not lost his crown". Sigmarsson won once again in 1986 with Capes coming second.

Aside from the World's Strongest Man, Capes also won Europe's Strongest Man on three occasions, in London (1980), Amsterdam (1982) and Marken (1984). He regained his Britain's Strongest Man title in 1981 and again in 1983. He won the World Muscle Power championship in 1987, and has been ascribed two World Muscle Power championships by the creator of the event, David Webster, although other sources suggest the 1987 victory was the only one. In 1987 his win in the World Muscle Power was accompanied by a win in the World Strongman Challenge and he is one of only three athletes to have won all three titles. There was no World's Strongest Man that year, but an event was held designed specifically to pit the three most successful strongmen against one another. Called the Pure Strength, the Ultimate Challenge, it featured Bill Kazmaier, Jón Páll Sigmarsson and Geoff Capes. The event was held at Huntly Castle and Capes entered despite having been in hospital the previous weekend with strained trapeziums. Strong performances in the first few rounds belied his condition but he eventually pulled out during the log-lift and ended the contest in third place. Capes, the oldest of the three, was close to strongman retirement at this stage and the next year, the World Muscle Power where he finished second, proved to be his last major outing as a strongman.

Highland Games
Capes competed at many Highland Games gatherings in Scotland and across the world and became a hugely popular and respected figure. He won the World Heavy Events title in Lagos in 1981, in a year when there were two world championships, the second won in Melbourne by Bill Anderson. He went on to win again in 1983 in Carmunnock and the next four consecutive titles, making him the most successful competitor ever in terms of titles. He set world records in many disciplines, including the 56 lb weight over the bar and brick lifting. As a Highland competitor he was dubbed Geoff Dubh Laidir, translated as Black Strong Geoff.

Personal records 
According to Capes himself
 Bench Press – 300 kg (661 lb) raw
 Squat – 380 kg (836 lb) raw
 Deadlift – 454.5 kg (1,000 lb) from height of 18 inches

Sport after retirement
Capes went on to coach many rising stars in both athletics and strength athletics. Adrian Smith later took fifth spot at the World's Strongest Man under the combined coaching of Capes and Bill Pittuck. Capes also helped promote the Daily Star funded UK Strongest Man tournaments until the turn of the millennium.

Life outside sport
Outside his sporting career Capes was for a long time a policeman and prior to that was a member of the Air Training Corps. Prior to his athletic retirement he had been awarded the Queen Elizabeth II Silver Jubilee Medal in 1977, for services to the community. He went on to run a sportswear retail shop in Holbeach, before moving to Spalding where in 1998 he became a Justice of the Peace. At the height of his fame in 1985, the game Geoff Capes Strongman was released on the Amstrad CPC, the ZX Spectrum and the Commodore 64, featuring a truck pulling and tug-of-war, allowing control of each muscle group. His profile also led to numerous appearances on British television, one such example being in the Tyne Tees Television programme Supergran in the episode "Supergran Grounded". He appeared on Blue Peter where he lost a challenge from Welsh strongman/showman George Davies (Strang the Strong, Georgie Muscles). In 1987, Capes was a timekeeper on the charity television special The Grand Knockout Tournament.

A persistent story about Capes is that in 1979, he stood in for friend and fellow strongman David Prowse to play the part of Darth Vader in several scenes during filming of The Empire Strikes Back while Prowse recovered from an elbow injury. During an interview on BBC Radio Cleveland on 31 January 2007, Capes was asked about this and he stated that it never happened. Another story, told on YouTube by former wrestler Mark Rocco, is that Big Daddy picked him up and threw him to the ground after Capes challenged him to 'wrestle' on a training ground.

Later, he appeared on the fourth series of Shooting Stars, alongside Patsy Kensit, where he threw a bomb at Johnny Vegas and in 2007 he became the face of Cadbury's Wispa relaunch, appearing on billboards and magazine advertisements. As of Spring 2010, he was in the advert for the Great British Food Fight, which appeared on Channel 4 as well as being in an advert for Churchill insurance.

Aside from sport and television appearances, Capes is famed for breeding budgerigars and has had quite a lot of success (a former world champion) on the show bench with his Recessive Pieds. In 2008 he assumed the role of president of the Budgerigar Society, along with Mick Widdowson who is also a keen budgie breeder and friend. He frequently appears in the pages of Cage & Aviary Birds.

Personal life
Capes lives in Stoke Rochford, near Grantham. His daughter Emma was English Schools' shot put champion and Youth Olympics bronze medallist. His son Lewis played American football for the London Monarchs. He has four grandchildren.

Competition record

International competitions

National championships
British National Championships (AAA)
1st: 1972, 1973. 1975-1979
2nd: 1971, 1974, 1980
3rd: 1970, 
UK Championships
1st in shot put: 1977-1979
3rd in discus: 1978

Highland Games
World Highland Games Championships
Winner 1981 to 1987

Strongman contests
World's Strongest Man
1st: 1983, 1985
2nd: 1981, 1986
3rd: 1980, 1984
4th: 1982
World's Strongest Team
Winner: 1987 
World Strongman Challenge
Winner: 1987 
Europe's Strongest Man
1st: 1980, 1982, 1984
2nd: 1983
World Muscle Power
1st: 1985
2nd: 1987, 1988
Battle of the Giants
1st: 1987-1989
Commonwealth Games Strongman
2nd: 1986
Britain's Strongest Man
1st 1979, 1981, 1983
British Muscle Power Championship
1st: 1986, 1987
UK Truck Pulling Championships - (Mercedes Benz)
1st: 1986

References

External links
 The Geoff Capes Foundation
 
 
 
 
 BBC article in 2001
 Speaking on Radio 4's Today programme about budgerigars
 Sunday Times article 27 December 2009

Living people
1949 births
People from Stoke Rochford
People from Holbeach
British male shot putters
English male shot putters
English strength athletes
British strength athletes
Olympic athletes of Great Britain
Athletes (track and field) at the 1972 Summer Olympics
Athletes (track and field) at the 1976 Summer Olympics
Athletes (track and field) at the 1980 Summer Olympics
Commonwealth Games gold medallists for England
Commonwealth Games medallists in athletics
Athletes (track and field) at the 1970 British Commonwealth Games
Athletes (track and field) at the 1974 British Commonwealth Games
Athletes (track and field) at the 1978 Commonwealth Games
European Athletics Championships medalists
British police officers
Medallists at the 1974 British Commonwealth Games
Medallists at the 1978 Commonwealth Games